Universal is a studio album by the U.K. Subs released in 2002 on Captain Oi! Records.

Track listing
All songs written by Charlie Harper, except where noted.
"Last Man Standing" - 3:01
"Soho" (Harper, Campbell) - 2:26
"Spoils of War" (Harper, Rankin) - 2:39
"3rd World England" (Harper, Rankin) - 2:24
"Universal" - 2:16
"Hollywood" - 1:39
"The Dark" (Harper, Rankin) - 4:05
"Fragile" (Harper, Rankin) - 2:38
"White Lie" (Jason Willer) - 2:53
"Don't Blame Islam" (Harper, Campbell) - 1:41
"Crossfire" - 2:58
"Papers Lie" (Harper, Rankin) - 2:04
"Custody" (Harper, Willer) - 2:07
"Devolution" (Harper, Campbell) - 2:34
"On My Way" - 2:37

Personnel
U.K. Subs
Charlie Harper - lead vocals, harmonica
Alan Campbell - guitar, backing vocals
Simon Rankin - bass, backing vocals
Jason Dulldrums - drums, backing vocals
Technical
Kieran Plunkett - sleeve artwork

References 

2002 albums
U.K. Subs albums